Ranelagh may refer to:

Towns and villages
 Ranelagh, a residential area and urban village on the south side of Dublin, Ireland
 Ranelagh, Buenos Aires, a suburb of Buenos Aires, Argentina
 Ranelagh, Ontario
 Ranelagh, Tasmania

Other places and geographical features
 The Ranelagh Club, a famous polo club formerly located at Barn Elms, South West London
 The Ranelagh River and Ranelagh Sewer, names at various times for parts of the River Westbourne
 Ranelagh Gardens, an 18th-century pleasure garden in Chelsea, London; now part of the grounds of Chelsea Hospital
 Ranelagh Gardens, Liverpool, a similar pleasure garden in Liverpool
 Ranelagh (Paris Métro), a station of the Paris Métro on the Rue de Ranelagh, Paris
 Ranelagh School, Bracknell, England

People and titles
 Baron Ranelagh, a title in the Peerage of Ireland
 Earl of Ranelagh, a title in the Peerage of Ireland
 Viscount Ranelagh, a title in the Peerage of Ireland

Schools
 Ranelagh School, a school in Berkshire, England

Other
 Ranelagh Harriers, a road running and cross-country club based in Richmond, London
 HMS Ranelagh (1697), a ship of the British Royal Navy